Jane Marie Chen is the co-founder of Embrace, a social enterprise startup that produces a low-cost infant warmer, that gives premature and low-birth-weight infants a better chance at survival.

She served as the first CEO of Embrace, the non-profit arm of the organization, before stepping into the chief executive officer (CEO) role of Embrace Innovations, the for-profit social enterprise that was spun off in 2012.

Early life and education 
Chen holds a BA in Psychology and Economics from Pomona College, a Masters in Public Administration from Harvard University, and an MBA from Stanford University.

Career 

Prior to Embrace, Chen worked with nonprofit organizations on healthcare issues in developing countries. She spent several years as the program director of a startup HIV/AIDS nonprofit in China (Chi Heng Foundation), and worked for the Clinton Foundation’s HIV/AIDS Initiative in Tanzania. She also worked at Monitor Group as a management consultant.

In 2013, Chen and the other co-founders of Embrace, Linus Liang, Nag Murty, and Rahul Panicker were awarded the Economist Innovation Award, under the category of Social and Economic Innovation. In the same year, Chen and her co-founder Rahul Panicker were also recognized as Schwab Social Entrepreneurs of the Year by the World Economic Forum. In 2014, Chen was invited to the White House's first ever Maker Faire, where she presented Embrace's work to President Obama. In the same year, Beyoncé made a $125,000 contribution through Chime for Change which allowed Embrace to distribute its infant warmers to nine countries in Sub-Saharan Africa.

Embrace 

While doing her MBA at Stanford, Chen and a few other fellow graduate students were assigned a class project to create a low-cost infant incubator that could be used in rural areas. In 2008, they co-founded Embrace, a 501(c)(3) non-profit, to bring their project to life. In January 2012, Embrace moved into a hybrid structure. The non-profit entity, Embrace, donates infant warmers to the neediest areas through NGO partners, and provides educational programs on newborn health alongside the distribution of warmers. The for-profit social enterprise, Embrace Innovations, sells the warmers to paying entities, including governments and private clinics, all focusing on emerging markets. Embrace Innovations, the for-profit social enterprise, raised its Series A round of financing in 2012 from Vinod Khosla's Impact Fund and Capricorn Investment Group. The company raised a second round of investment capital from Marc Benioff in 2014.

In 2016, Embrace Innovations launched a line of consumer baby products called Little Lotus Baby (temperature regulating swaddles and sleeping bags), which have a buy-one give-one model. The Little Lotus products use the technology used in the Embrace warmer to keep babies at an ideal skin temperature, thereby helping to improve their sleep.

Awards and recognition
Chen has been a TED speaker, and was selected as one of Forbes' Impact 30 in 2011. In 2019, Chen was featured in AOL/Verizon/Yahoo's "FUTURIST" Series, profiling industry leaders across all different disciplines who are advancing their fields with technology, innovation, and fearlessness. Chen has been recognized as the Inspirational Young Alumni of the Year by Pomona College, and selected as a "Woman of Distinction" by the American Association of University Women. Chen has spoken at numerous international conferences, including the Skoll World Forum, Bloomberg Design Conference, Forbes Women's Summit, and the World Economic Forum.

In 2012, Chen was named as a Young Global Leader by the World Economic Forum, and was featured in Dove's "Real Role Models" campaign for women and girls. She was also profiled in AOL's Makers campaign. Chen is a TED Fellow, Echoing Green Fellow, and Rainer Arnhold Fellow.

References

External links 
 Jane Chen Video produced by Makers: Women Who Make America
 

1978 births
Living people
American people of Chinese descent
American women chief executives
American nonprofit chief executives
Harvard Kennedy School alumni
HIV/AIDS activists
People from Upland, California
Pomona College alumni
Stanford University alumni
American women company founders
American company founders
American people of Taiwanese descent
Winners of The Economist innovation awards
Social entrepreneurs
21st-century American women